Patricia Blair (born Patsy Lou Blake; January 15, 1933 – September 9, 2013) was an American television and film actress, primarily on 1950s and 1960s television. She is best known as Rebecca Boone in all six seasons of NBC's Daniel Boone, with co-stars Fess Parker, Darby Hinton, Veronica Cartwright, and Ed Ames. She also played Lou Mallory on the ABC western series The Rifleman, in which she appeared in 22 episodes with Chuck Connors, Johnny Crawford and Paul Fix.

Biography
Patsy Lou Blake was born in Fort Worth, Texas and grew up in Dallas. She became a teenage model through the Conover Agency. While acting in summer stock, Warner Bros. discovered her and she began acting in films under the names Patricia Blake and Pat Blake. In the late 1950s she appeared as the second female lead in several films for Warner Bros. and later for MGM. Her first movie was Jump Into Hell (1955), about the Battle of Dien Bien Phu in French Indochina.

She had a recurring role as Goldy, one of Madame Francine's hostesses, on the 1958 TV series Yancy Derringer. In 1962 she starred as Lou Mallory in The Rifleman, replacing actress Joan Taylor as Chuck Connors's love interest on that series. She also made a guest appearance in 1963 on Perry Mason as murderer Nicolai Wright in "The Case of the Badgered Brother".  She made guest appearances as well on other television series, such as The Bob Cummings Show, Rescue 8,  Gunsmoke,  Richard Diamond, Private Detective, The Virginian, and Bonanza.

Blair had considered moving to New York City in 1964 until screenwriter Gordon Chase helped her get a role on the NBC series Daniel Boone. She played wife Rebecca Boone, opposite Fess Parker for six seasons, with Darby Hinton as son Israel and future multi - Primetime Emmy Award nominee Veronica Cartwright as daughter Jemima. Blair became concerned that her TV daughter, played by Cartwright, made her appear aged and she refused to sign a contract for season three unless Cartwright was dropped from the show. After the series ended in 1970, her career struggled, and she appeared in only a few minor films and television spots. Her last appearance in a feature film was in 1979, portraying a fashion narrator in The Electric Horseman starring Robert Redford. In her later years she produced trade shows in New York and New Jersey.

On February 14, 1965, the 32-year-old Blair married 42-year-old land developer Martin S. Colbert in Los Angeles, California. The couple divorced in 1993. Colbert died in 1994.

Death
Blair died at her home in North Wildwood, New Jersey at age 80 from breast cancer.

Selected filmography

Film
Jump Into Hell (1955) - Gisele Bonet
The McConnell Story (1955) - Wife (uncredited)
Crime Against Joe (1956) - Christine 'Christy' Rowen
The Black Sleep (1956) - Laurie Monroe
City of Fear (1959) - June Marlowe
Cage of Evil (1960) - Holly Taylor
The Ladies Man (1961) - Working Girl
The Electric Horseman (1979) - Fashion Narrator

Television
The Bob Cummings Show (1957) - Joanne Taylor
The Dennis O'Keefe Show (10 May 1960) - Gretchen Clayhipple
Tramp Ship (1961, Episode: "pilot")
The Rifleman (1962–1963, 22 episodes) - Lou Mallory
My Three Sons (1963) - Valerie
The Virginian (1963) - Rita Marlow
Perry Mason (1963) - Nicolai Wright
Bonanza (1964, Episode: "The Lila Conrad Story") - Lila Conrad
Daniel Boone (1964–1970, 118 episodes) - Rebecca Boone
Dusty's Trail (1973) - Mary Ellen Barstow

References

External links

 
 
 
The Rifleman Episode Guide List
Daniel Boone TV Episode Guide

1933 births
2013 deaths
American film actresses
American television actresses
People from Fort Worth, Texas
People from North Wildwood, New Jersey
Actresses from Texas
Deaths from breast cancer
Deaths from cancer in New Jersey
Western (genre) television actors
21st-century American women